The black-headed penduline tit (Remiz macronyx) is a species of bird in the family Remizidae.
It is found in ''
Central Asia.

References

black-headed penduline tit
Birds of Central Asia
black-headed penduline tit
Taxobox binomials not recognized by IUCN